Vijay  is an Indian film. It was released in 1942. The film also had Baby Meena (Meena Kumari, as a child artist).

References

External links
 

1942 films
1940s Hindi-language films
Indian black-and-white films